Dikaia is a village in the northern part of the Evros regional unit in Greece. Dikaia was the seat of the former municipality of Trigono, and is part of the municipality Orestiada since 2011.  In 2011, its population was 561 for the village and 834 for the community, which includes the villages Dilofos, Krios and Palli. It is located on the right bank of the river Evros, where it forms the border with Bulgaria. It is about 15 km southeast of Svilengrad, Bulgaria, and 25 km west of Edirne, Turkey.

Transport

Road
Dikaia is bypassed by the Greek National Road 51/E85 (Alexandroupoli - Soufli - Orestiada - Ormenio - Svilengrad).

Rail
The settlement is served by railway station on the Alexandroupoli–Svilengrad line with services to Alexandroupoli, Ormenio and Didymoteicho.

Population

The town is populated by Arvanites.

See also

List of settlements in the Evros regional unit

External links
Dikaia on GTP Travel Pages

References

Trigono
Populated places in Evros (regional unit)
Albanian communities of Western Thrace